Symphonia Domestica, Op. 53, is a tone poem for large orchestra by Richard Strauss. The work is a musical reflection of the secure domestic life so valued by the composer himself and, as such, harmoniously conveys daily events and family life.

History and composition
In 1898, Strauss became the chief conductor of the Royal Court Opera in Berlin. It was at this point in his life that the composer took a keen interest in his own circumstances and turned his attention to his status and personal history. When he began composing the Symphonia Domestica, he intended it to be the sequel to Ein Heldenleben, the next installment of the autobiography of the now-successful artist.

He worked on the piece during 1903, finishing it on New Year's Eve, in Charlottenburg.

The piece is scored for piccolo, 3 flutes, 2 oboes, oboe d'amore, English horn, clarinet in D, 3 clarinets (2 in B, 1 in A), bass clarinet in B, 4 bassoons, contrabassoon, 4 saxophones (soprano in C, alto in F, baritone in F, bass in C) that are ad libitum (optional)), 8 horns in F, 4 trumpets in F and C, 3 trombones, tuba, timpani, bass drum, triangle, cymbals, glockenspiel, 2 harps, and strings.

Structure

The program of the work reflects the simplicity of the subject matter. After the whole extended family (including the aunts and uncles) has been introduced, the parents are heard alone with their child. The next section is a three-part adagio which begins with the husband's activities. The clock striking 7 a.m. launches the finale.

The most detailed exposition of the work's structure is that which was provided for the Berlin Philharmonic's performance on 12 December 1904. On that occasion, the concert programme carried the following outline:

I. Introduction and development of the chief groups of themes
The husband's themes (F major): 
(a) Easy-going

(b) Dreamy

(c) Surly

(d) Fiery

The wife's themes (B major):
(a) Lively and gay

(b) Grazioso

The child's theme (D minor): 
Tranquil

II. Scherzo
Parents' happiness. Childish play. 

Cradle song [quotation from Felix Mendelssohn's "Venetian Boat Song", Op. 19b, No. 6 from Songs Without Words] (The clock strikes seven in the evening).

III. Adagio
Doing and thinking. Love scene. Dreams and cares (the clock strikes seven in the morning).

IV. Finale
Awakening and merry dispute (double fugue). Joyous confusion.
I. Thema

II. Thema

Performance

Strauss reserved the premiere for his American tour in 1904, and Carnegie Hall in New York was booked. He would conduct it himself. Originally the premiere was scheduled for 9 March, but the orchestral parts were delayed, so it was postponed to 21 March. The later date allowed more rehearsals, of which 15 were required before Strauss was satisfied. The Wetzler Symphony Orchestra was adequate, but not much more. During a performance of his Don Quixote two nights earlier, the orchestra had broken down in the middle of the piece.

Nevertheless, the performance was a great success, so much so that he was prevailed upon to conduct two more performances in Wanamaker's department store in New York, on 16 and 18 April, for a fee of $1,000.  An entire sales floor had to be cleared to make way for the huge orchestra, and the concerts attracted audiences of 6,000 people.  The New York and German press were very critical, not just of these exhibitions but of the very work itself, regarding them as a blatant commercialization of the sacred art of music and the intimacy of family life. Strauss responded: "True art ennobles this Hall, and a respectable fee for his wife and child is no disgrace even for an artist".

The Viennese premiere of the Domestica was conducted by Gustav Mahler on 23 November 1904.

A typical performance of the work lasts approximately forty-four minutes.

In 1924 Strauss wrote the Wedding Prelude for two harmoniums (Trv 247) for the occasion of the wedding of his son Franz with Alice Grab-Hermannswörth, based largely on themes found in the Symphonia Domestica. In 1925, Strauss wrote a piece for Paul Wittgenstein for piano left-hand and orchestra, again using themes from the Symphonia Domestica, titled Parergon zur Symphonia Domestica, Op. 73.

Discography

There is also a two-piano version, which Martha Argerich and Alexandre Rabinovitch recorded in 1995 for Teldec.

References

External links

Tone poems by Richard Strauss
1903 compositions